Damir Amangeldyevich Ismagulov (born February 3, 1991) is a Russian mixed martial artist, who competes in the Lightweight division for the Ultimate Fighting Championship. He is the former M-1 Global lightweight champion. As of March 14, 2023, he is #12 in the UFC lightweight rankings.

Background
As a child, he played football, was fond of horseback riding, tried himself in track and field athletics. Subsequently, he moved to Orenburg for permanent residence, enrolling in the Institute of Physical Culture and Sports of the Orenburg State Pedagogical University. As a student, he was engaged in various types of martial arts, fulfilled the standards of a master of sports in universal combat and in army hand-to-hand combat. Since 2011, he practised MMA at the amateur level. In 2014, after winning the Russian Cup, he was awarded the title of Master of Sports in mixed martial arts. Ismagulov is a practising Muslim and is ethnic Kazakh.

Mixed martial arts career

M-1 Global
Ismagulov was M-1 Global lightweight champion after beating Maxim Divnich in the title bout. After defending the M-1 Lightweight Championship twice, defeating such fighters as Raul Tutarauli and Artem Damkovsky, he signed a contract with the UFC.

Ultimate Fighting Championship
Ismagulov made promotional debut on December 2, 2018, at UFC Fight Night: dos Santos vs. Tuivasa against Alex Gorgees. He won the fight via unanimous decision.

Ismagulov faced Joel Álvarez on February 23, 2019, at UFC Fight Night: Błachowicz vs. Santos. He won the fight via unanimous decision.

Ismagulov faced Thiago Moisés on August 31, 2019, at UFC on ESPN+ 15. He won the fight via unanimous decision.

Ismagulov faced Rafael Alves on May 22, 2021, at UFC Fight Night: Font vs. Garbrandt. He won the bout by unanimous decision.

Ismagulov was expected to face Magomed Mustafaev on October 30, 2021, at UFC 267. However at the weigh-ins, Ismagulov came in at 163.5 pounds, missing weight by 7.5 pounds, the bout was subsequently cancelled by the UFC.

Ismagulov faced Guram Kutateladze on June 18, 2022, at UFC on ESPN 37. He won the close bout via split decision.

Ismagulov faced Arman Tsarukyan on December 17, 2022, at UFC Fight Night 216. He lost the fight via unanimous decision.

On January 1, 2023, Ismagulov announced his retirement on Instagram, citing 'circumstances and health problems'. On January 29, Damir revealed that according to his contract with the UFC, he had one more fight left, so he decided to fight as agreed.

Championships and accomplishments

Mixed martial arts
 M-1 Global
 M-1 Global Lightweight Championship (Three times)  
 2017 M-1 Global Fighter of the Year

Mixed martial arts record

|- 
|Loss
|align=center|24–2
|Arman Tsarukyan
|Decision (unanimous)
|UFC Fight Night: Cannonier vs. Strickland
| 
|align=center|3
|align=center|5:00
|Las Vegas, Nevada, United States
|
|-
|Win
|align=center|24–1
|Guram Kutateladze	
|Decision (split)
|UFC on ESPN: Kattar vs. Emmett
|
|align=center|3
|align=center|5:00
|Austin, Texas, United States
|
|-
|Win
|align=center|23–1
|Rafael Alves
|Decision (unanimous)
|UFC Fight Night: Font vs. Garbrandt
|
|align=center|3
|align=center|5:00
|Las Vegas, Nevada, United States
|
|-
| Win
| align=center| 22–1
| Thiago Moisés
| Decision (unanimous)
| UFC Fight Night: Andrade vs. Zhang
| 
| align=center| 3
| align=center| 5:00
| Shenzhen, China
| 
|-
| Win
| align=center| 21–1
| Joel Álvarez
| Decision (unanimous)
| UFC Fight Night: Błachowicz vs. Santos
| 
| align=center| 3
| align=center| 5:00
| Prague, Czech Republic
| 
|-
| Win
| align=center| 20–1
| Alex Gorgees
| Decision (unanimous)
| UFC Fight Night: dos Santos vs. Tuivasa
| 
| align=center| 3
| align=center| 5:00
| Adelaide, Australia
| 
|-
| Win
| align=center| 19–1
| Artem Damkovsky
| TKO (hand injury)
| M-1 Challenge 94
| 
| align=center| 1
| align=center| 3:53
| Orenburg, Russia
| 
|-
| Win
| align=center| 18–1
| Raul Tutarauli
| Decision (unanimous)
| M-1 Challenge 88
| 
| align=center| 5
| align=center| 5:00
| Moscow, Russia
| 
|-
| Win
| align=center| 17–1
| Rogério Matias da Conceição
| Decision (unanimous)
| M-1 Challenge 85
| 
| align=center| 3
| align=center| 5:00
| Moscow, Russia
| 
|-
| Win
| align=center| 16–1
| Maxim Divnich
| TKO (punches)
| M-1 Challenge 78
| 
| align=center| 5
| align=center| 4:47
| Orenburg, Russia
| 
|-
| Win
| align=center| 15–1
| Morgan Heraud
| TKO (punches)
| M-1 Challenge 74
| 
| align=center| 3
| align=center| 1:31
| Saint Petersburg, Russia
|
|-
| Win
| align=center| 14–1
| Murat Bakhtorazov
| TKO (punches)
| rowspan=3|Alash Pride FC: Zhekpe Zhek
| rowspan=3|
| align=center| 1
| align=center| 3:52
| rowspan=3| Almaty, Kazakhstan
|
|-
| Win
| align=center| 13–1
| Aibek Nurseit
| TKO (punches)
| align=center| 1
| align=center| 4:03
| 
|-
| Win
| align=center| 12–1
| Temirlan Aysadilov
| TKO (punches)
| align=center| 2
| align=center| 2:49
| 
|-
| Win
| align=center| 11–1
| Rubenilton Pereira
| Decision (unanimous)
| M-1 Challenge 72
| 
| align=center| 3
| align=center| 5:00
| Moscow, Russia
|
|-
| Win
| align=center| 10–1
| Ilias Chyngyzbek
| Decision (unanimous)
| Naiza FC 6
| 
| align=center| 5
| align=center| 5:00
| Aktau, Kazakhstan
|
|-
| Win
| align=center| 9–1
| Raul Tutarauli
| TKO (punches)
| M-1 Challenge 66
| 
| align=center| 3
| align=center| 3:49
| Orenburg, Russia
|
|-
| Win
| align=center| 8–1
| Vyacheslav Ten
| Submission (rear-naked choke)
| M-1 Challenge 65
| 
| align=center| 1
| align=center| 2:31
| Saint Petersburg, Russia
| 
|-
| Win
| align=center| 7–1
| Gennady Sysoev
| TKO (submission to punches)
| Scythian Gold: MMA Fight Night
| 
| align=center| 3
| align=center| N/A
| Orenburg, Russia
|
|-
| Win
| align=center| 6–1
| Javier Fuentes
| TKO (punches)
| OMMAF: Scythian Gold 2015
| 
| align=center| 1
| align=center| N/A
| Orenburg, Russia
|
|-
| Loss
| align=center| 5–1
| Ramazan Esenbaev
| Decision (unanimous)
| M-1 Challenge 61
| 
| align=center| 3
| align=center| 5:00
| Nazran, Russia
|
|-
| Win
| align=center| 5–0
| Pedro Eugenio Granjo
| TKO (punches)
| M-1 Challenge 59
| 
| align=center| 1
| align=center| 2:53
| Astana, Kazakhstan
|
|-
| Win
| align=center| 4–0
| Sergei Andreev
| Decision (unanimous)
| M-1 Challenge 57
| 
| align=center| 3
| align=center| 5:00
| Orenburg, Russia
|
|-
| Win
| align=center| 3–0
| Faud Aliev
| Decision (unanimous)
| Kazakhstan MMA Federation: Battle of Nomads 3
| 
| align=center| 3
| align=center| 5:00
| Oral, Kazakhstan
|
|-
| Win
| align=center| 2–0
| Eldar Magomedov
| TKO (punches)
| Kazakhstan MMA Federation: Battle of Nomads 2
| 
| align=center| 1
| align=center| 4:32
| Almaty, Kazakhstan
|
|-
| Win
| align=center| 1–0
| David Bácskai
| TKO (punches)
| OMMAF: Scythian Gold 2014
| 
| align=center| 1
| align=center| 3:57
| Orenburg, Russia
|
|-

See also
 List of male mixed martial artists

References

External links
 
 

1991 births
Living people
People from Orenburg
Russian people of Kazakhstani descent
Lightweight mixed martial artists
Mixed martial artists utilizing ARB
Russian male mixed martial artists
Ultimate Fighting Championship male fighters
Sportspeople from Orenburg Oblast
Russian Muslims